A beach armoured recovery vehicle (BARV) is an armoured recovery vehicle used for amphibious landings.

There have been three different BARVs in British service since their introduction during World War II. They have also been used by Dutch and Australian forces.

Sherman BARV

The original BARV was a Sherman M4A2 tank which had been waterproofed and had the turret replaced by a tall armoured superstructure. Around 60 were deployed on the invasion beaches during the Battle of Normandy. Able to operate in 9-foot (2.7 metre) deep water, the BARV was used to remove vehicles that had become broken-down or swamped in the surf and were blocking access to the beaches. They were also used to re-float small landing craft that had become stuck on the beach. Unusually for a tank, the crew included a diver whose job was to attach towing chains to stuck vehicles.

The vehicles were developed and operated by the Royal Electrical and Mechanical Engineers. The Sherman M4A2 model was chosen as a basis for the BARV as it was thought that the Sherman's welded hull would be easier to waterproof than other tanks. Unlike other Sherman models, the M4A2 was powered by a diesel engine because it was believed the tank would be less affected by the sudden temperature changes caused by the regular plunges into cold water. A few Sherman BARVs continued to be used until 1963, when they were replaced by a vehicle based on the Centurion tank.

M3 BARV

A single M3A5 Grant tank was converted into a BARV in 1950 by the Australian Army. This remained in service until 1970

Centurion BARV
By the late 1950s, Sherman BARVs were becoming less useful as they were unable to recover the heavier armoured vehicles that were being introduced. The Centurion BARV FV 4018 was developed as a replacement. A mild-steel prototype was followed in 1960 by 12 production vehicles. These were based on the hulls of Mark 1, 2, and 3 Centurion tanks that by this time were redundant. Although initially assigned to the Army, they were passed to the Royal Marines when the Army's amphibious assault role was given to the Marines. The  BARV was basically a Centurion body with built up sides to accommodate wading in water up to 11 feet. The design was functional yet crude with sloped armour built above the tank hull. The tracks for the BARV were reversed so they had better grip biting in reverse.
The Centurion BARV retained the gun-tank's Rolls-Royce Meteor petrol engine.

Centurion BARVs had a crew of four; two of the crew were members of the Royal Electrical and Mechanical Engineers, one of whom was a qualified diver.
The Centurion BARVs were built to provide the essential role for the LPD's HMS Fearless & HMS Intrepid as part of the Beach Assault Squadrons. 

The Assault Squadrons were initially a mix of Royal Marines and Army serving aboard the ships. The transition to this being all Royal Marines was seen to be essential.
The crew for the BARVs would be handed to the Royal Marines with a sergeant, two corporals and a marine, all qualified vehicle mechanics, responsible for driving and maintaining the tank, and also providing full mechanical breakdown services for all embarked vehicles. 
The training for the crew would take place at Bovington Camp for driver training and at the home of the BARV, RM Instow in North Devon, the Royal Marines amphibious testing centre.
 
There were many occasions when the BARV would break down or get stuck. In 1981 the BARV from Fearless was to be lost at sea off Browndown beach to end up fully submerged. The following year both BARVs would see service during the Falklands War, being the largest land vehicles ashore, with the BARV from Fearless breaking its drivetrain whilst working Blue Beach.

All the Centurion-derived BARVs have now left service and have been sold to collectors and museums around the world.

Hippo BRV

In 2003, the Centurion BARV's replacement was introduced. This is the Hippo BRV, which had been in development under the project name of "Future Beach Recovery Vehicle" (FBRV). The name change reflects the fact that, unlike previous generations of vehicle used in this role, Hippos are not fully armored.

The Hippo is a conversion by Alvis Moelv of a Leopard 1A5 tank. The incorporation of Alvis Vickers into BAE Systems meant that elements of the work moved to BAE Land Systems, Sweden, formerly known as "Hägglunds", another ex-Alvis company. As with earlier generations of BARV, the main alteration has been the replacement of the turret with a raised superstructure which, in this case, resembles the bridge or wheelhouse of a small ship. Other modifications include the addition of working platforms, a nosing block, raised air intakes and an auxiliary power unit; this has raised the weight of the vehicle from 42.5 tonnes to 50 tonnes.

Currently, four Hippos are in British service, one each on HMS Albion and Bulwark, with two used by 11 Amphibious Trials and Training Unit Royal Marines. The vehicle is reportedly well liked by its users, but its lack of commonality with the other armoured vehicles used by the UK has caused spares support problems, exacerbated by the poor nature of the Initial Spares Support package procured from Alvis Moelv by the UK's Defence Procurement Agency. This area is being tackled by the MoD's Defence Logistics Organisation.

The Netherlands Marine Corps operates four similar Dutch Leopard 1V-based BRV vehicles known as Hercules, Samson, Goliath and Titan which operate out of the Royal Netherlands Navy assault ships of the Rotterdam class. The vehicles have a similar specification but a different cabin appearance.

Survivors

In England, the REME Museum of Technology in Lyneham and the D-Day Story in Portsmouth both have Sherman BARVs on display. Another, in running condition, is held by the War and Peace Collection, a private military collection in the UK.  The wrecked hulk of another is at The Tank Museum, after being used as a firing range target. Another Sherman BARV is a museum-piece in India, at the Cavalry Tank Museum, Ahmednagar. The Australian M3 BARV is preserved at the Royal Australian Armoured Corps Tank Museum at Puckapunyal, Australia. The museum also has a second BARV that was based on a bulldozer.

Centurion BARVs are on display at The Tank Museum (UK), at Yad La-Shiryon in Latrun - the IDF tank museum - and at the Israel Defense Forces History Museum (Batey ha-Osef) in Tel-Aviv. A Centurion BARV, in private hands, is parked and able to be viewed at the entrance of a farm on Colne Road, Bures Hamlet, Essex, England. 

AeroVenture in Doncaster, UK has a Centurion BARV 02 ZR 77 on display as part of its Falklands War Collection. This was originally one of the first Centurions built as part of the first contract between 1944 and 1946 (the exact date of build is unknown). It was one of the two BARVs that took part in Operation Sutton, the British landings at San Carlos with one from HMS Fearless supporting the landings on Blue Beach and one from HMS Intrepid supporting the landings on Red Beach and remains the longest-serving armoured vehicle in the British forces, leaving service in 2005 after taking part in both Gulf conflicts.

References

External links

Sherman BARV at REME Museum of Technology
Sherman BARV photo gallery
Centurion BARV photo gallery
The US M3 Medium Series in Australia
Photos of the Dutch Navy variant of the Hippo BARV, German language

Tracked armoured recovery vehicles
Armoured fighting vehicles of the United Kingdom
Amphibious military vehicles
Royal Marines
Royal Electrical and Mechanical Engineers
Military vehicles introduced from 1940 to 1944